Colonial National Historical Park is located in the Hampton Roads region of Virginia and is operated by the National Park Service of the United States government. The park protects and interprets several sites relating to the Colony of Virginia and the history of the United States more broadly, ranging from the site of the first landing of the English settlers who would settle at Jamestown, to the battlefields of Yorktown where the British Army was finally defeated in the American Revolutionary War. Over 3 million people visit the park each year.

Units

Colonial Parkway

The park includes the Colonial Parkway, a scenic  parkway linking the three points of Virginia's Historic Triangle: Jamestown and Yorktown and running through the historic district of Colonial Williamsburg. The Colonial Parkway is located in James City County, York County, and the city of Williamsburg.

Jamestown

The park includes the original site of Jamestown, known in modern times as Historic Jamestowne. Located in James City County at the southern end of the Colonial Parkway, it encompasses the area of Jamestown Island, including the Jamestown Glasshouse. Adjacent to it is the Commonwealth of Virginia's complementary attraction known as Jamestown Settlement.

Yorktown Battlefield
At the eastern end of the Colonial Parkway, in York County at Yorktown, the park operates the Yorktown Battlefield. The Nelson House, which was built around 1724, may have served as Cornwallis's headquarters during the final battle of the Revolutionary War. 

The battlefield was the site of the British defeat. Both the house and the historic siege earthworks were restored in 1976. The Moore House is located in the eastern part of the park; this is where surrender negotiations took place in 1781. 

Nearby are located the state-operated American Revolution Museum at Yorktown and the Yorktown Riverwalk Landing area.

Green Spring Plantation
Sir William Berkeley, who held the colonial governorship during the longest periods of any individual, used his Green Spring Plantation as an experimental farm to attempt to develop sources of income for the colony other than cultivated tobacco and traded furs.

The preserved portion of the site of Green Spring has been largely untouched since the second dwelling there and dependencies were destroyed during the American Civil War (1861–1865), promising a rich archaeological dig area to follow upon recent discoveries at the Park's location on Jamestown Island.

Cape Henry Memorial

The Cape Henry Memorial, site of the first landing of the Captain Christopher Newport and the soon-to-be Jamestown colonists in 1607, is located in the city of Virginia Beach, Virginia at Cape Henry. Open to the public, it is located off U.S. Route 60 on the Navy base Joint Expeditionary Base East.

Administrative history
Colonial National Monument was authorized on July 3, 1930. It was established on December 30, 1930. On June 5, 1936, it was redesignated a national historical park. The cemetery at Yorktown was transferred from the War Department to the National Park Service on August 10, 1933.

Jamestown National Historic Site is co-owned by the National Park Service and Preservation Virginia (formerly known as the Association for the Preservation of Virginia Antiquities) and administered by the NPS, was designated on December 18, 1940. Preservation Virginia owns  containing the remains of the original 1607 fort. The National Park Service owns the remaining  of the island which contains the archeological remains of the expanded towne and its island plantation sites.

As with all historical areas administered by the National Park Service, Colonial National Historical Park and Jamestown National Historic Site are listed on the National Register of Historic Places of the U.S. Department of the Interior.

See also
Island Drive, a historic road within the park.

References

External links

Official NPS website: Colonial National Historical Park
Cape Henry Memorial
Green Spring Plantation
Friends of Green Spring a large interactive web site with streaming video and essays ("The voices of Green Spring")
Jamestown National Historic Site
Yorktown Battlefield
Yorktown National Cemetery
Yorktown National Cemetery - a roster and photo of burials
More information on the Battle of Yorktown

 
Historic American Engineering Record in Virginia
American Revolutionary War museums in Virginia
American Revolutionary War sites
Archaeological sites in Virginia
Museums in York County, Virginia
National Historical Parks of the United States
National Register of Historic Places in James City County, Virginia
Parks in James City County, Virginia
Parks in Virginia Beach, Virginia
Parks in Williamsburg, Virginia
Parks in York County, Virginia
Protected areas established in 1930
National Park Service areas in Virginia
Historic districts on the National Register of Historic Places in Virginia
Cemeteries in James City County, Virginia
Cemeteries in York County, Virginia
Parks on the National Register of Historic Places in Virginia
1930 establishments in Virginia
United States national cemeteries
American Revolution anniversaries
Virginia historical anniversaries